The two Eiffel Towers in Cedar Fair parks—one at Kings Dominion and one at Kings Island—are replicas of the Eiffel Tower in Paris, France. They opened at Kings Island in 1972 and Kings Dominion in 1975, each when the park originally opened.

Statistics
Both of the replicas at Kings Dominion and Kings Island are one-third replicas of the Eiffel Tower in Paris. They were both constructed by then-owner Taft Broadcasting.

Kings Dominion
The Eiffel Tower at Kings Dominion was built by Bristol Steel. It was modeled and built at Kings Island three years prior to construction. It is the centerpiece of the park, located in the International Street section of the park, just beyond the fountains at the main entrance. It is currently the tallest attraction at Kings Dominion if measured by the top of the structure. It is the 4th tallest if measured by the observation platform with Drop Tower, Intimidator 305 and WindSeeker being taller. It is constructed of 450 tons of steel. Elevators in the replica were installed by Haushahn Elevator of Austria with subsequent modernizations and upgrades in recent years.

Kings Island
The Eiffel Tower at Kings Island was built by Southern Ohio Fabricators, and designed by Intamin Inc. It is the centerpiece of the park, located in the International Street section of the park, just beyond the fountains at the main entrance. It is currently the largest attraction at Kings Island if measured by the top of the structure. If measured by the observation platform, it is one foot shy of Drop Tower for being the second tallest with Orion  being the tallest. 15,000 bolts hold together the structure with 410 steps leading to the top. Unlike Kings Dominion, Kings Island features Fast Lane which enables visitors to get to the front of the line without waiting. It is also a 1/3 scale of the real Eiffel Tower in Paris, France. During the 2021-2022 off season the ride got repainted for the park's 50th anniversary celebration.

References

External links

 The Eiffel Tower at Kings Dominion
 The Eiffel Tower at Kings Island

Amusement rides manufactured by Intamin
Amusement rides introduced in 1972
Amusement rides introduced in 1975
Towers completed in 1972
Towers completed in 1975
Cedar Fair attractions
Eiffel Tower reproductions
Kings Dominion
Kings Island
Observation towers in the United States
1972 establishments in Ohio
1975 establishments in Virginia